is a Japanese mecha anime produced by Toei Animation, and is the final installment to Takara's Magne-Robo Franchise. It follows the adventures of five teenagers as they fight against an evil alien force using the titular combining mecha, Barattack. The show aired on TV Asahi between 1977 and 1978.

The series is loosely related to Himitsu Sentai Gorenger and its sequel series JAKQ Dengekitai as the five main characters wear multicolored costumes. Unlike the sentai teams in the aforementioned series, they do not engage in hand-to-hand martial arts combat, only fighting in their combining mecha.
All 31 episodes were released on three Region 2 DVD sets in Japan in March, April, and May 2010.

References

External links
 Chōjin Sentai Barattack at Toei Animation
 
 

1977 anime television series debuts
1978 Japanese television series endings
Super robot anime and manga
Toei Animation television
Super Sentai